Bilal Akoro (born 14 December 1999) is a Togolese footballer who plays as a winger for AS Douanes and the Togo national team.

International career
Akoro represented Togo at the under-17 and under-20 levels.

Akoro made his debut with the senior national team in a 0–0 2020 African Nations Championship qualification tie with Benin on 28 July 2017.

References

External links
 

1999 births
Living people
People from Centrale Region, Togo
Togolese footballers
AS Douanes (Togo) players
Togo international footballers
Association football wingers
21st-century Togolese people
Togo under-20 international footballers
Togo youth international footballers
Togo A' international footballers
2020 African Nations Championship players